Arunava Sen is an Indian politician. He is serving as MLA of Bagnan Vidhan Sabha Constituency in West Bengal Legislative Assembly. He is an All India Trinamool Congress politician.

References

Year of birth missing (living people)
Living people
Trinamool Congress politicians from West Bengal
West Bengal MLAs 2016–2021
West Bengal MLAs 2011–2016